This is a list of current and former Roman Catholic churches in the Roman Catholic Archdiocese of San Francisco. The Archdiocese of San Francisco includes the City and County of San Francisco and the Counties of Marin and San Mateo.

The mother church of the Archdiocese is the Cathedral of Saint Mary of the Assumption, completed in 1971 in the Cathedral Hill neighborhood of San Francisco. It replaced the previous Cathedral, dedicated in 1891 at the NW corner of Van Ness Avenue and O'Farrell Street, which was destroyed in an arson blaze in September 1962.  The original Old Saint Mary's Cathedral at California Street and Grant Avenue, dating back to the mid-1850s, is still in active use and now functions as a parish church.  The archdiocese also includes many other historic churches including Mission San Francisco de Asís, the oldest building in San Francisco, and Saints Peter and Paul Church, known as the Italian cathedral of the West.

San Francisco County

Deanery 1
Deanery 1 consists of San Francisco's Sunset District, Forest Hill, Parkside, Westwood Park, and Lakeside neighborhoods.

Deanery 2
Deanery 2 consists of the Bayview/Hunter's Point neighborhood, and the Excelsior District, Visitacion Valley, and Crocker Amazon, and Ingleside areas.

Deanery 3
Deanery 3 consists of the Western Addition, Japantown, The Castro, Haight-Ashbury, Richmond District, and Cow Hollow neighborhoods.

Deanery 4
Deanery 4 consists of San Francisco's Financial District, Chinatown, North Beach, Tenderloin District, and SOMA areas.

Deanery 5
Deanery 5 consists of the Mission District, Bernal Heights, Glen Park, Potrero Hill, and Noe Valley.

Marin County

San Mateo County

References

 
San Francisco
Roman Catholic churches in California